Medieval Warriors is a video game released by Merit Software in 1991 for Amiga and MS-DOS. It is a turn-based strategy game with an isometric view.

Gameplay
Each map has 4 scenarios where the 2 teams are set up in different starting arrangements. The match starts with 12 warriors on each side and each turn you can move each unit once and attack with each unit once. Each unit has at least one of 4 weapons, a throwing knife, a throwing axe, an arrow and a sword. The sword is the only direct attack weapon the rest are ranged. The damage and range of each weapon is different for each fighter.

The game is won by killing all enemy units.

External links 
Medieval Warriors at Lemon Amiga

1991 video games
Amiga games
DOS games
Merit Studios games
Single-player video games
Turn-based strategy video games
Video games developed in the United States